The Bennett Schoolhouse Road Covered Bridge, near Minford, Ohio, was built in 1867.  It was listed on the National Register of Historic Places in 1978.

It is located southeast of Minford.

It was a King post truss bridge and was a work of V.B. Farney.  It has also been known as the Tuttleville Bridge and as Bridge No. 35-73-03.

It carried Bennett Schoolhouse Road over the Little Scioto River at Harrison Mills in Harrison Township, Scioto County, Ohio.

The historic covered bridge is no longer in place.

References

Covered bridges in Ohio
National Register of Historic Places in Scioto County, Ohio
Bridges completed in 1867